Dark Secret (1929 – September 15, 1934) was an American Thoroughbred racehorse. He was bred and raced by Wheatley Stable, a partnership between Gladys Mills Phipps and her brother, Ogden Mills, the United States Secretary of the Treasury.

Dark Secret was the son of 1925 Kentucky Derby winner Flying Ebony. His dam was Silencia, a daughter of King James who was the American Champion Older Male Horse of 1909.

Among his important wins, in 1933 Dark Secret won the  mile-and-half Manhattan and Bowie Handicaps plus the two mile Jockey Club Gold Cup. The following year he won these two races again but after crossing the finish line in the Gold Cup he broke a foreleg and had to be put down.

External link
 Dark Secret's pedigree and partial racing stats

References

 Breslin, Jimmy, Sunny Jim: The life of America's most beloved horseman, James Fitzsimmons. (1962) Doubleday & Company, Inc. ASIN: B0007DY5XS 

1929 racehorse births
1934 racehorse deaths
Horses who died from racing injuries
Thoroughbred family 2-h
Racehorses bred in Kentucky
Racehorses trained in the United States